Khakhu Bandh is a small village in the southern part of Bihiya block in Bhojpur district, Bihar, India. As of 2011, its population was 426, in 56 households.

References 

Villages in Bhojpur district, India